Territory Storm, also referred to as Northern Territory Storm or NT Storm, is an Australian netball team that represented Netball Northern Territory in the Australian Netball League. Territory Storm  played in the ANL between 2008 and 2019. Between 2017 and 2019 they formed a partnership with Sunshine Coast Lightning and were effectively Lightning's reserve team.

History

Australian Netball League
Between 2008 and 2019, Territory Storm played in the Australian Netball League. They were founder members of the ANL. In December 2015, Netball Northern Territory announced that they were temporarily withdrawing Storm from the ANL league due to a lack of proper playing facilities and the cost of traveling interstate for away matches.

After missing the 2016 ANL season, Territory Storm rejoined in 2017 after forming a partnership with Sunshine Coast Lightning.
Between 2017 and 2019 they were effectively Lightning's reserve team. In 2018 Storm won their first game in six years. In 2019, with a team featuring Lightning players Cara Koenen, Annika Lee-Jones, Peace Proscovia, and Jacqui Russell, Storm enjoyed one of their best seasons, winning six matches and  finishing fifth.

Regular season statistics

Australian Netball Championships
In July 2021, Territory Storm was not included among the teams listed to participate in the inaugural Australian Netball Championships. Their former partners, Sunshine Coast Lightning, opted to enter their own team.

Home venues
Territory Storm initially played their home games at various venues in and around Marrara, Northern Territory. These included outdoor courts, the Marrara Indoor Stadium and Darwin Basketball Association courts. They have occasionally played home games in Alice Springs.
During their partnership with Sunshine Coast Lightning, Storm also played homes games at USC Stadium, usually as part of a double header. In 2019 they played home games at the Territory Netball Stadium.

Notable players

Internationals

 Joanne Morgan

 Karyn Bailey
 Samantha Poolman

 Ama Agbeze 

 Fiona Themann

 Peace Proscovia

 Kate McMeeken-Ruscoe

Sunshine Coast Lightning
 Cara Koenen
 Annika Lee-Jones
 Peace Proscovia
 Jacqui Russell

Suncorp Super Netball
 Kate Eddy
 Beryl Friday

Head coaches

References

 
Netball teams in Australia
Sunshine Coast Lightning
Australian Netball League teams
Netball
Netball in the Northern Territory
Sports clubs established in 2008
2008 establishments in Australia
Sports teams in the Northern Territory